Stocky may refer to:

Humans
Tom Stocky
Stocky Edwards

Snail
Stocky pebblesnail

See also
Stocki (disambiguation)